Rashid Alievich Sunyaev (born 1 March 1943 in Tashkent, USSR) is a German, Soviet, and Russian astrophysicist of Tatar descent. He got his MS degree from the Moscow Institute of Physics and Technology (MIPT) in 1966. He became a professor at MIPT in 1974. Sunyaev was the head of the High Energy Astrophysics Department of the Russian Academy of Sciences, and has been chief scientist of the Academy's Space Research Institute since 1992. He has also been a director of the Max Planck Institute for Astrophysics in Garching, Germany since 1996, and Maureen and John Hendricks Distinguished Visiting Professor in the School of Natural Sciences at the Institute for Advanced Study in Princeton since 2010.

Works
Sunyaev and Yakov B. Zeldovich developed the theory for the evolution of density fluctuations in the early universe. They predicted the pattern of acoustic fluctuations that have been clearly seen by WMAP and other CMB experiments in the microwave sky and in the large-scale distribution of galaxies. Sunyaev and Zeldovich stated in their 1970 paper, "A detailed investigation of the spectrum of fluctuations may, in principle, lead to an understanding of the nature of initial density perturbations since a distinct periodic dependence of the spectral density of perturbations on wavelength (mass) is peculiar to adiabatic perturbations." CMB experiments have now seen this distinctive scale in temperature and polarization measurements. Large-scale structure observations have seen this scale in galaxy clustering measurements.

With Yakov B. Zeldovich, at the Moscow Institute of Applied Mathematics, he proposed what is known as the Sunyaev-Zeldovich effect, which is due to electrons associated with gas in galaxy clusters scattering the cosmic microwave background radiation.

Sunyaev and Nikolay I. Shakura developed a model of accretion onto black holes, from a disk, and he has proposed a signature for X-radiation from matter spiraling into a black hole. He has collaborated in important studies of the early universe, including the recombination of hydrogen and the formation of the cosmic microwave background radiation. He led the team which operated the X-ray observatory attached to the Kvant-1 module of the Mir space station and also the GRANAT orbiting X-ray observatory. Kvant made the first detection of X-rays from a supernova in 1987. His team is currently preparing the Spectrum-X-Gamma International Astrophysical Project and is working with INTEGRAL spacecraft data. At Garching he is working in the fields of theoretical high energy astrophysics and physical cosmology and participates in the data interpretation of the ESA Planck spacecraft mission.

Honors and awards
 1984 - Member of the Russian Academy of Sciences
 1988 - Bruno Rossi Prize for his contributions to understanding cosmic X-ray sources, especially the structure of accretion disks around black holes, the X-ray spectra of compact objects, and the Mir-based discovery of hard X-ray emission from supernova 1987A
 1991 - Foreign Associate of USA National Academy of Sciences
 1995 - Gold Medal of the Royal Astronomical Society
 2000 - Bruce Medal for a lifetime of outstanding research in astronomy
 2000 - State Prize of Russian Federation for research of Black Holes and Neutron stars with GRANAT X-ray and gamma-ray astrophysical observatory in 1990-1998
 2002 - Alexander Friedman Prize by Russian Academy of Sciences for the publications on the reduction of brightness of cosmic microwave background radiation in the direction of clusters of galaxies
 2003 - Heineman Prize for outstanding work in astrophysics
 2003 - Gruber Prize in Cosmology for pioneering studies on the nature of the cosmic microwave background and its interaction with intervening matter that led to new cosmological models
 2003 - Member of German Academy of Natural Scientists Leopoldina
 2004 - Foreign Member of the Royal Netherlands Academy of Arts and Sciences
 2007 - International Member of the American Philosophical Society
 2008 - Crafoord Prize  for decisive contributions to high-energy astrophysics and cosmology.
 2008 - Henry Norris Russell Lectureship in 2008
 2008 - Karl Schwarzschild Medal of the German Astronomische Gesellschaft
 2009 - Foreign Member of the Royal Society
 2009 - King Faisal International Prize for Science (Physics)
 2011 - Kyoto Prize
 2012 - Benjamin Franklin Medal in Physics from the Franklin Institute
  2013 - Order of Merit of Republic of Tatarstan, Russia
 2013 - Gold Medal of the Tatarstan Academy of Sciences (Kazan, Russia)
 2014 - Einstein Professorship (Chinese Academy of Sciences)
 2019 - Dirac Medal, (ICTP)  jointly  with Viatcheslav Mukhanov and Alexei Starobinsky
 2019 - Nick Kylafis Lectureship
 2023 - Max Planck Medal of the DPG

Literature

References

External links

 Syunyaev Rashid Alievich. Site of Russian Academy of Sciences
 Biography at the website of Tatarstan Academy of Sciences
 Rashid Sunyaev Institute for Advanced Study

1943 births
Living people
Soviet cosmologists
Russian astrophysicists
Soviet astrophysicists
Soviet Muslims
Russian inventors
Tatar people of Russia
Corresponding Members of the USSR Academy of Sciences
Full Members of the Russian Academy of Sciences
Foreign Members of the Royal Society
Kyoto laureates in Basic Sciences
Members of the Royal Netherlands Academy of Arts and Sciences
Academic staff of the Moscow Institute of Physics and Technology
Moscow Institute of Physics and Technology alumni
Recipients of the Gold Medal of the Royal Astronomical Society
Scientists from Tashkent
Recipients of the Cross of the Order of Merit of the Federal Republic of Germany
Russian Muslims
Winners of the Dannie Heineman Prize for Astrophysics
Foreign associates of the National Academy of Sciences
Nuclear weapons program of the Soviet Union
Max Planck Institute directors

tt:Räşid Sönniev